The Void is the philosophical concept of nothingness manifested. The notion of the Void is relevant to several realms of metaphysics. The Void is also prevalent in numerous facets of psychology, notably logotherapy.

The manifestation of nothingness is closely associated with the contemplation of emptiness, and with human attempts to identify and personify it. As such, the concept of the Void, and ideas similar to it, have a significant and historically evolving presence in artistic and creative expression, as well as in academic, scientific and philosophical debate surrounding the nature of the human condition.

In Western mystical traditions, it was often argued that the transcendent 'Ground of Being' could therefore be approached through aphairesis, a form of negation.

Philosophy
Western philosophers have discussed the existence and nature of void since Parmenides suggested it did not exist and used this to argue for the non-existence of change, motion, differentiation, among other things.  In response to Parmenides, Democritus described the universe as only being composed of atoms and void.

Aristotle, in Book IV of Physics, denied the existence of the Void with his rejection of finite entities.

Stoic philosophers admitted the subsistence of four incorporeals among which they included void: "Outside of the world is diffused the infinite void, which is incorporeal. By incorporeal is meant that which, though capable of being occupied by body, is not so occupied. The world has no empty space within it, but forms one united whole. This is a necessary result of the sympathy and tension which binds together things in heaven and earth. Chrysippus discusses the void in his work On Void and in the first book of his Physical Sciences; so too Apollophanes in his Physics, Apollodorus
, and Posidonius in his Physical Discourse, book ii."

There were questions as to whether void was truly nothing or if it was in fact filled with other things, with theories of aether being suggested in the 18th century to fill the void.

Mysticism

Peter Matthiessen in The Snow Leopard (1978) described an experience of sitting on rocks in the Himalayas as leading to an awareness of a Void at the centre, or the source, of phenomenal existence: "These hard rocks instruct my bones in what my brain could never grasp in the Heart Sutra, that 'form is emptiness and emptiness is form' – the Void, the emptiness of blue-black space, contained in everything."

For Ken Wilber in Spectrum of Consciousness (1977), the Void is not mere nothingness, and is therefore distinct from something that can be subsumed into the category of nihilism, and is instead "reality before we slice it up into conceptualism". Here he explores the idea of Śūnyatā, which cannot be "called void or not void; or both or neither" but can be referred to as 'the Void' with, again, the proviso that it exists beyond the limit of language.

Stanislav Grof's distinction between holotropic and hylotropic experience is important here, with the former encapsulating experiences which connect to the Void.

Psychology
Viktor Frankl Man's Search for Meaning (1946)

Religious and spiritual conceptions
Absolute (philosophy)
Ground of Being
Ma
Nirvana
Śūnyatā

The Void is also an important concept in martial arts such as Aikido.

Particle physics
Atomic physics, according to Paul Brunton, has proven that the world "derives from a mysterious No-thing."

A similar line of argument is explored in The Void (2007) by Frank Close, who discusses the concept of 'empty space' from Aristotle through to Newton, Mach, Einstein and beyond (including the idea of an 'aether' and current examinations of the Higgs field).

Another perspective on the matter from a scientific angle is the work of the physicist Lawrence Krauss, particularly his 2012 book A Universe from Nothing, in which he explores the idea of the universe having been derived from a quantum vacuum (which may or may not be the same as a philosophical concept of the nothingness of the Void, depending on how it is defined). A further consideration is the enigmatic nature of dark energy which may be seen as coterminous with the Void.  His work has received sustained criticism from David Albert and others working in both philosophy and physics.

In popular culture

Art
Marina Abramović, Holding emptiness (2012).
Alberto Giacometti, Hands Holding the Void (Invisible Object). (1934)
Yves Klein, Le Vede (The Void) (1958) and "Leap Into the Void" (1960).
Lee Ufan, Marking Infinity (2011).

Music
 Steve Roach, The Magnificent Void (1996).
 The Beatles, "Tomorrow Never Knows" (1966).
 Hole, The Void (1995)
 Old Season, "The Void" (2017).
 Nine Inch Nails, "Into the Void" (1999).
 Palaye Royale, "love the Void" (2018).
 Klangos, "Vergessen" (2020).
 Pouya "Void" (2018)
 Townes Van Zandt "Nothin'" (1970).
Literature
Albert Camus and absurdism.
Jack Kerouac's Desolation Angels (1965).

Video games
The Dishonored franchise.EverQuest contains a zone called "The Void".Hollow Knight by Team Cherry, with Void being one of the main elements.Dark Souls contains an analogous concept known as "the Abyss."

FilmsAltered States, a 1980 American science-fiction horror film directed by Ken Russell.Crimes and Misdemeanors, a 1989 American existential comedy-drama film written and directed by Woody Allen.Nothing, a 2003 Canadian philosophical comedy-drama film directed by Vincenzo Natali.Beyond the Black Rainbow, a 2010 Canadian science fiction horror film written and directed by Panos Cosmatos.

See also
 Chaos (cosmogony)

References

External links
 William Barrett Irrational Man: A Study in Existential Philosophy (1962)
 Viktor Frankl Man's Search for Meaning (1946)
 Jean-Paul Sartre Being and Nothingness'' (1943)

Concepts in metaphysics